Robert Henry Arthur Wells (born 7 April 1962) is a Swedish singer, songwriter and musician best known for the musical , which contains elements of rock, classical and boogie-woogie.

Early life and career 
Wells was born in Stockholm. He attended the Adolf Fredrik's Music School in Stockholm at the age of 7 in 1969 and four years later, at the age of 11, became the youngest person ever to attend the Royal Swedish Academy of Music. At the age of 16 in 1978, Wells won two major Swedish talent contests. Wells has also participated twice in Melodifestivalen.

Wells was the musical director of two Swedish television shows. Wells appeared regularly on Så ska det låta, the Swedish version of The Lyrics Board.

Wells's first musical tour was with the Leningrad Orchestra in 1991. 
Wells's music was chosen as the official television theme music for the 2008 Olympic games in Beijing.

Eurovision 
Wells played piano during the Belarus entry at the Eurovision Song Contest 2010 on 25 May performed by 3+2.

Discography

Albums 

"—" denotes releases that did not chart or unknown.

Singles

Videos 
1987: Robert Wells

DVDs 
2002: Rhapsody in Rock – The Stadium Tour 2002
2004: Rhapsody in Rock – The Anniversary Tour
2005: Rhapsody in Rock- The 2005 Summer Tour

Other works

Books 
2003: Mitt Liv Som Komphund
2019: Blod, Svett & Toner

Awards and honors
The Charlie Norman Honor Prize, 2011
H. M. The King's Medal, 8th size with blue ribbon, 2012

See also 
 List of Swedish composers

References

External links 

 
 Rhapsody in Rock: Robert Wells

Swedish composers
Swedish male composers
Swedish pianists
1962 births
Living people
Male pianists
21st-century pianists
21st-century Swedish male musicians
Eurovision Song Contest entrants for Belarus
Eurovision Song Contest entrants of 2010
Melodifestivalen contestants of 2003
Melodifestivalen contestants of 1987